A special election was held in  on October 11, 1814 to fill a vacancy caused by the resignation of James Whitehill (DR) on September 1, 1814. This was the second resignation from the 3rd district in the 13th congress, the previous resignation having been in the previous year.

Election results

Slaymaker took his seat on December 12, 1814

See also
List of special elections to the United States House of Representatives

References

Pennsylvania 1814 03
Pennsylvania 1814 03
1814 03
Pennsylvania 03
United States House of Representatives 03
United States House of Representatives 1814 03